Thổ Chu Island ( or đảo Thổ Châu) is the largest island of Thổ Chu Islands in the Gulf of Thailand. Here lies the administrative center of Thổ Châu Commune, Phú Quốc District, Kiên Giang Province, Vietnam. In the West, the island is also known as Poulo Panjang or Pulo Panjang.Please see An Nam đại quốc họa đồ, southmost of Việt Nam.

Geography
There are four beaches on the island (Bai Ngu, Bai Dong, Bai Mun and Bai Nhat) of which the largest are Bai Ngu (literally "Royal Beach") and Bai Dong.

Environment
Thổ Chu Island has beautiful natural environment with high-density coral reefs, fine white sand beaches and pristine forests. A majority of 99 species of coral present here belong to two genera Montipora and Acropora of Acroporidae. The flora consists of about two hundreds of species, mostly Clusiaceae, Fabaceae và Sapotaceae. The island is also home to endemic gecko species Cyrtodactylus thochuensis. However, Thổ Chu is being threatened by environmental pollution since domestic waste is dumped into the sea.

History
During the era of Republic of Vietnam, Thổ Chu Island was under the administration of An Xuyên Province.

On May 10, 1975, the Khmer Rouge occupied the island and, as reported by the Hanoi government, "destroyed villages, killed many people, and abducted 515 inhabitants of the island". From May 24 to May 27, 1975, Vietnamese forces attacked the occupiers and recaptured the island. In 1977, the Khmer Rouge raided Thổ Chu Island once again but were defeated.

On April 27, 1992, under the arrangement of the People's Committee of Kien Giang Province, six families with about thirty people moved to Thổ Chu Island and settled there. On April 24, 1993, the Vietnamese government decided to establish Thổ Châu Commune which has been in charge of administrating the whole archipelago.

Demography
The majority of inhabitants are navy personnel and border guards who chose to settle on the island. As of early 2012, there are 513 households with about 1,700 people who mainly reside at Bai Ngu and Bai Dong. The residents' lives are not easy as they have to move around the island twice a year to avoid storms. In the southwest monsoon from April to August, people move from Bai Ngu to Bai Dong and in the northeast monsoon from September to March, they reverse their migration.

Infrastructure
Thổ Chu Island has only one electric generator for Bai Ngu. The island does not have a water supply network so military personnel and civilians have to dig wells to get water. Mobile information services of Viettel, MobiFone and Vinaphone have reached the island. Thổ Chu Island Lighthouse was set up on January 25, 2000. In addition, the island has a school, a post office and a temple commemorating the victims of the Khmer Rouge.

Economy
In general, the economy of Thổ Chu Island is still difficult. Local residents live mainly by fishing, including seafood trading and fisheries logistics. The efficiency in the exploitation of marine resources is only at low level. According to Decision No. 18/2009/QD-TTg by the Prime Minister of Vietnam, Tho Chu Island is planned to become a large fisheries service center of the region.

See also
 Search for Malaysia Airlines Flight 370, suspected to have crashed nearby

References

External links
 Tho Chu Islands Travel Guide
 Where is Flight MH370?

Islands of Vietnam
Landforms of Kiên Giang province
Islands of the Gulf of Thailand